Wodziłki  is a village in the administrative district of Gmina Jeleniewo, within Suwałki County, Podlaskie Voivodeship, in north-eastern Poland.

The village has a population of 70.

References

Villages in Suwałki County